Iron Baron, or a variation of the title, may refer to:

 Iron Baron, South Australia, an iron ore mine
 
 Bettino Ricasoli (1809–1880), 1st Count of Brolio, 2nd Baron Ricasoli, nicknamed "The Iron Baron" 
 Iron Baron, a character from Marvel's Secret Wars, see Hydra

See also
Iron Duke (disambiguation)
Iron Lady (disambiguation)
Iron Lord (disambiguation)